Polyotidium is a monotypic genus of flowering plants from the orchid family, Orchidaceae. The sole species is Polyotidium huebneri, native to Colombia, Venezuela and Brazil.

See also 
 List of Orchidaceae genera

References 

 Berg Pana, H. 2005. Handbuch der Orchideen-Namen. Dictionary of Orchid Names. Dizionario dei nomi delle orchidee. Ulmer, Stuttgart

External links 

Orchids of South America
Monotypic Epidendroideae genera
Oncidiinae genera
Oncidiinae